Oceana Mackenzie (born 11 July 2002) is an Australian climber.

Career
Mackenzie started climbing when she was 8 years old. At the age of 15, she began to take part in the IFSC Climbing World Cup. She reached her first IFSC final of a Bouldering World Cup in Meiringen in 2019. At the 2020 Oceania Championships, she was able to win the Combined event and qualify for the 2020 Summer Olympics in Tokyo.

Mackenzie was ranked nineteenth after the Qualification round at the Tokyo Olympics and therefore did not compete in the finals. Full details are in Australia at the 2020 Summer Olympics.

References

2002 births
Living people
Sportspeople from Heidelberg
Australian rock climbers
Olympic sport climbers of Australia
Sport climbers at the 2020 Summer Olympics
21st-century Australian women